Lone Pine may refer to:

Places
 Lone Pine, California
   Lone Pine, California, former name of McFarland, California
 Lone Pine Barracks, an Australian Army base in New South Wales
 Lone Pine Commonwealth War Graves Commission Cemetery
 Lone Pine Koala Sanctuary in Brisbane
   Lone Pine (Evergreen, Louisiana), listed on the NRHP in Louisiana
 Lone Pine (Tarboro, North Carolina), listed on the NRHP in North Carolina
 Lone Pine Township, Itasca County, Minnesota

Arts, entertainment, and media
Lone Pine (books),  a series of children's books written by Malcolm Saville
 Lone Pine International, a chess tournament
 Lone Pine Publishing

Botany
 Lone Pine (tree)
 Pinus brutia
 Pinus halepensis

Historical events
 1872 Lone Pine earthquake, one of the largest earthquakes to hit California in recorded history
 Battle of Lone Pine, at Gallipolli, Turkey during WWI